Bey's Palace is a historic palace in Oran, Algeria dating back to the Ottoman era. The palace is situated in Sidi al-Houari, near the mount Marjaju, and it is categorized as a national heritage. The palace was built in 18th century, commissioned by Muhammad Bey the Great. The palace has an area size of around 5.6 hectare. It consists of diwan (public room), suite, harem, two guard towers which date back to 1345 during the Marinid era, barracks (which were used as a horse stable as well by both Ottomans and French), courtyard, and several other adjacent facilities. Today it is a favorite spot for tourists both domestic and foreign.

Gallery

References

18th-century establishments in Africa
Buildings and structures in Oran
Palaces in Algeria
Ottoman palaces
Ottoman architecture in Algeria
Buildings and structures completed in the 18th century
18th-century architecture in Algeria